Dr. Goldfoot and the Girl Bombs (Italian: Le spie vengono dal semifreddo, lit. "The spies who came in from the cool") is a 1966 Eurospy comedy film, made in Technicolor and directed by Mario Bava. Serving as a sequel to two unrelated films, Dr. Goldfoot and the Bikini Machine and Two Mafiosi Against Goldginger, the film stars Vincent Price, Fabian, Francesco Mulé, Laura Antonelli, and the Italian comic duo Franco and Ciccio.

The film was shot in Italy by cinematographer Antonio Rinaldi, and released in both English and Italian versions. The Italian release is markedly different from the English-language edition, with more screen time spent on the antics of Franco and Ciccio, and less on Vincent Price and the other cast members. Additionally, the film's Italian title is entirely different, spoofing the 1965 film The Spy Who Came in from the Cold.

Plot 
Price plays the titular mad scientist who is working with the Chinese government to use exploding female robots to disrupt a scheduled NATO war-game by blowing up the various generals involved in the exercise (one of whom looks exactly like Goldfoot, and whom Goldfoot later impersonates). Fabian is the hero who works to thwart the plot, that is, when he is not busy chasing women such as Laura Antonelli's character. The film ends with an extended frantic chase through the streets of Rome, and Goldfoot attempting to start World War III between Russia and the United States by dropping a nuclear bomb on Moscow.

Cast

 Vincent Price as Dr. Goldfoot and General Willis
 Fabian as Bill Dexter
 Franco Franchi as Franco
 Ciccio Ingrassia as Ciccio
 Laura Antonelli as Rosanna
 Francesco Mulé as Colonel Doug Benson
 Moa Tahi as Hardjob 
 George Wang as Fong 
 Gianfranco Funari as US Army Official 
 Ennio Antonelli as Goldfoot Henchman 
 Veriano Ginesi as Goldfoot Henchman 
 Amerigo Santarelli as Goldfoot Henchman 
 Mario Bava as Angel playing Harp

Production

Development
Fulvio Lucisano, the head of Italian International Film, wanted to make a sequel to the Franco and Ciccio film Two Mafiosi Against Goldginger. American International Pictures agreed to co-finance, provided it could be turned into a sequel to Dr. Goldfoot and the Bikini Machine.

To satisfy the multinational financial backers, two versions of the film were eventually produced: the Italian version places greater emphasis on Franco and Ciccio, while the American film puts forward Vincent Price's Goldfoot.

Mario Bava was signed to direct. He had no interest in the film but was hired because Lucisano had him under contract, and he did not participate in the post-production phase of the American version.

AIP's executive supervising the shoot was Louis M. Heyward who had worked with Bava on Planet of the Vampires.

Casting
Frankie Avalon was originally intended to reprise his role as Craig Gamble from the first film, but he pulled out due to the impending birth of his third child, and Fabian Forte was cast in his place. Fabian said Jim Nicholson of AIP came to him and said "Frankie's having another baby and wants to stay at home... and we have this picture shooting in Italy... [he] was so sweet about it".

At one stage, the film was titled Dr. Goldfoot and the Love Bomb (a reference to How I Learned to Stop Worrying and Love the Bomb, the strapline of Dr. Strangelove), and Dr. Goldfoot and the S Bomb (a tongue-in-cheek reference to the phrase "sex bomb").

Filming
Filming started in April 1966 and took place in Rome, mostly at Cinecitta Studios but also such locations as Parco di Principe, the Rome Cavalieri Hilton, and Luna Park.

Louis M. Heyward estimates the script was rewritten about nine times just prior to production and says there were difficulties satisfying the Italian and American backers; some different scenes were shot for each country, including emphasising brunettes in the Italian version and blondes in the American version.

Heyward later said: "We had one person speaking Portuguese, several of them speaking Italian. Vincent would shake his head in disbelief and say 'What is happening to me?' Not only did he not understand the Italians or the Portuguese or the Spanish; he didn't understand Fabian".

When Price was asked about working with Bava he said: "I don't know what happened on the one we did together but perhaps it was not his fault".

Bava made a cameo as an angel.

Reception
Two versions of the film were released, one in Italy which emphasized the Italian stars and relegated Price to a "guest star". The American version focused on Goldfoot/Price and was re-edited by Ronald Sinclair, re-scored, and re-written in the dubbing, all without Bava's input. Tim Lucas says the Italian version was "the far more entertaining" but "aside from some charmingly naive special effects" which Bava supervised the movie "cannot really be considered a Mario Bava film".

The film was not particularly successful, and is considered by many critics to be director Bava's worst film.

Samuel Z. Arkoff said that the film's commercial reception was hurt by the refusal of female lead Laura Antonelli to take her clothes off. Arkoff claims she was originally willing to, but then his nephew, Ted Rusoff, who was sent to supervise the film, developed a crush on her and persuaded her not to do it.

Price later called the film "the most dreadful movie I've ever been in. Just about everything that could go wrong, did".

Fabian said "I hid in the back seat of my car at the drive in when I went to go see it".

Bibliography

References

External links 
 
 
 Dr Goldfoot and the Girl Bombs at Mario Bava site
 Dr Goldfoot at the Girl Bombs at TCMDB
 

1966 films
1960s parody films
1960s spy comedy films
1960s science fiction comedy films
American parody films
American spy comedy films
American sequel films
Films directed by Mario Bava
Mad scientist films
Android (robot) films
Italian parody films
Italian spy comedy films
1960s Italian-language films
American International Pictures films
Films set in Rome
Italian sequel films
Films produced by Fulvio Lucisano
1966 comedy films
Parody films based on James Bond films
1960s American films
1960s Italian films